In an Expression of the Inexpressible is the fourth studio album by American alternative rock band Blonde Redhead. It was released on September 8, 1998, by Touch and Go Records.

Critical reception

Reviewing In an Expression of the Inexpressible for NME in 1998, Kitty Empire praised Blonde Redhead's music as "a noble enterprise, fraught with detuned Sonic Youth guitars and scything hardcore fury." AllMusic critic Matthew Hilburn attributed the album's "fuller and more polished" sound to Guy Picciotto and John Goodmanson's production and commented that Blonde Redhead has "never sounded quite as good", despite expressing mild reservations about the band's vocal and guitar performances. Nick Mirov of Pitchfork was less enthusiastic, writing that the band strives for "laid-back tension and moody sexiness" but instead sounds "lethargic and unengaging."

In 2018, In an Expression of the Inexpressible was listed as the 46th best album of 1998 by Pitchfork. In an accompanying essay, Pitchfork writer Claire Lobenfeld noted the album's shift away from the grittier sound of earlier Blonde Redhead recordings, and toward "a more romantic and uncharacteristically lustrous version of the Sonic Youth mimesis of their first three albums."

Track listing

Personnel
Credits are adapted from the album's liner notes.

Blonde Redhead
 Kazu Makino – guitar, vocals
 Amedeo Pace – guitar, vocals
 Simone Pace – drums, keyboards

Additional personnel
 John Goodmanson – production, recording
 Guy Picciotto – voice on "Futurism vs. Passéism Part 2", production
 Howie Weinberg – mastering

References

External links
 
 

1998 albums
Blonde Redhead albums
Albums produced by John Goodmanson
Albums produced by Guy Picciotto
Touch and Go Records albums